Silver is the debut studio album by American country rock band Silver, it was released in May 1976 through Arista Records.

Critical reception

Rob Caldwell of AllMusic wrote, "Wham Bam, a fairly weak slice of bubblegum pop, was the hit from the album. Given to the band by Arista because the company didn't hear a single among the other tracks."

Track listing 
Credits adapted from the album's liner notes.

Personnel
Silver 
 Tom Leadon – vocals, bass
 Harry Stinson – vocals, drums
 Greg Collier – vocals, guitar
 Brent Mydland – vocals, keyboards
 John Batdorf – vocals, guitar

Production 
 Tom Sellers – producer
 Clive Davis – producer 
 Joe Sidore – engineer, producer
 John "Maverick" Simmons – co-producer

Design 
 Guy Webster – photography
 Phil Hartman – sleeve design

References

1976 debut albums
Country albums by American artists
Arista Records albums